The Korea Museum of Modern Costume is a fashion museum in Seoul, South Korea.

See also
List of museums in South Korea

External links
[ Official site]

Art museums and galleries in Seoul
Fashion museums in South Korea